Ferrocarriles Vascongados was a railway company in the Basque Country, Spain; founded in 1906 as the merger of three railway companies. FEVE took over its operations in 1972, which in 1982 were transferred to the new company Basque Railways. Ferrocarriles Vascongados was dissolved in 1995, after more than two decades without activity.

History 

Ferrocarriles Vascongados was founded in 1906 with the merger of three different companies:
 . It operated the Bilbao- line, opened in 1882; as well as the Durango-Elorrio branchline, opened in 1905.
 . Its line, running from Durango to Zumarraga, opened in phases between 1887 and 1889. It also owned the San Pedro de Carquízano (Elgoibar) branch.
 . Opened in phases between 1893 and 1901, it ran from Elgoibar to San Sebastián.
Although the three companies were independent, they had numerous shareholders in common and overlapping interests. After long negotiations, the three companies merged on 1 July 1906. The merger of the companies was followed by a strong growth in both passenger and freight traffic. In 1929 its lines were electrified, with the exception of the Elorrio branch which was electrified in 1946. Together with the electrification, the company acquired its first non-inherited rolling stock, composed of electric Brown Boveri and ASEA locomotives and Ganz railcars. During the 1920s the company tried to acquire the Amorebieta-Pedernales railway, but ultimately failed due to its long-running liquidity problems. An extension of the Elorrio branch to Mondragón was studied in 1946, but wasn't carried out due to lack of funding. The company reached its peak in the aftermath of the Spanish Civil War, but the improvements in road transport since the 1950s marked the start of its decline.

Together with the declining traffic levels, the infrastructure and rolling stock became more obsolete. By the early 1970s the company was in a very difficult position, and on 25 June 1972, the government-owned company FEVE took over its operations. In 1982, the former Ferrocarriles Vascongados network became the backbone of the new Basque Railways (now Euskotren), owned by the Basque Government.

Despite ceasing operations in 1972, the company wasn't immediately disbanded. In 1976, an agreement was reached with the government regarding the transfer of its assets. This allowed the company to pay back its debts, and on 29 December 1995 its shareholders dissolved the company.

Rolling stock 
After the merger, the new company inherited the steam locomotives and the coaches owned by its predecessors. Ferrocarriles Vascongados and its predecessors operated a total of 71 steam locomotives, built by Couillet, Nasmyth & Wilson, Porter, Hanomag and Krauss. Due to the electrification of the Bilbao-San Sebastián line in 1929, electric rolling stock was acquired. Fourteen new locomotives were built by Brown Boveri and ASEA, and fourteen railcars by Ganz. In the 1950s, three more ASEA locomotives were bought, as well as four second-hand railcars. The last rolling stock acquired consisted of four railcars built by Ferrocarriles Vascongados itself in the 1960s. Most of these train types were inherited by FEVE and later by Euskotren.

Steam locomotives

Electric and gasoline-electric rolling stock

References

Citations

Sources

External links
 

 
1906 establishments in Spain
Railway companies established in 1906
1995 disestablishments in the Basque Country (autonomous community)
Railway companies disestablished in 1995
Railway companies of the Basque Country (autonomous community)
Organisations based in Bilbao